Singalong Jubilee was a CBC Television programme produced between 1961 and 1974. It featured musical performances by local singers, playing folk, country, and gospel music, in studio on stage and on location. Anne Murray, Catherine McKinnon, Ken Tobias, Edith Butler, Robbie MacNeill and Bud Spencer first gained fame from appearing on the show.

Singalong Jubilee replaced the equally long-running Don Messer's Jubilee, which featured many of the same performers, including McKinnon. The series was produced by Manny Pittson in Halifax, Nova Scotia, and was co-hosted by music producer Bill Langstroth and singer Jim Bennet. (Langstroth was Anne Murray's future husband), with Brian Ahern as the music director.

The programme's theme song was Farewell to Nova Scotia.

References

 Dick, Ernest J. (2004)  Remembering Singalong Jubilee. Formac, Canada.

External links
 CBC Television Series 1952 to 1982, Sev-Spr
Recording Albums of Singalong Jubilee

CBC Television original programming
1960s Canadian music television series
1970s Canadian music television series
1961 Canadian television series debuts
1974 Canadian television series endings
Television shows filmed in Halifax, Nova Scotia
Country music television series